The Normals were an American 1970s punk band from New Orleans, Louisiana, United States.

References

External links
Your Punk Heritage 1977-84 at AllMusic

American punk rock groups
Musical groups from New Orleans